Thomas Koch (born August 17, 1983) is an Austrian professional ice hockey player. He is currently playing with EC KAC in the ICE Hockey League (ICEHL). He re-joined for his second tenure with Klagenfurt after captaining EC Red Bull Salzburg on April 16, 2011.

Koch played in the 2011 IIHF World Championship as a member of the Austria men's national ice hockey team.

Career statistics

Regular season and playoffs

International

References

External links

1983 births
Austrian ice hockey forwards
EC KAC players
EC Red Bull Salzburg players
Living people
Sportspeople from Klagenfurt
Luleå HF players
Ice hockey players at the 2014 Winter Olympics
Olympic ice hockey players of Austria